Anke Huber was the defending champion, but lost in the quarterfinals to Alexia Dechaume.

Brenda Schultz won the title by defeating Dechaume 7–6(7–5), 6–2 in the final.

Seeds

Draw

Finals

Top half

Bottom half

References

External links
 Official results archive (ITF)
 Official results archive (WTA)

Women's Singles
Singles